Taharpur is a village in Thane district of Maharashtra State, India.

Aghai is a nearby village.

References 

Villages in Thane district